Ole Hesselbjerg (born 23 April 1990) is a middle-distance runner from Denmark. He competed in the 3000 metres steeplechase at the 2016 Olympics, but failed to reach the final.

In 2015 Hesselbjerg graduated in physics from Eastern Kentucky University in the United States. After returning to Denmark he worked part-time in a  restaurant in Copenhagen so he could have time for training. He did not qualify for the 2016 Olympics, yet was invited to participate because fewer than the required 45 athletes ran the qualification time, and he was ranked 44th in the world in 2016.

References

1990 births
Living people
Danish male middle-distance runners
Danish male steeplechase runners
Olympic athletes of Denmark
Athletes (track and field) at the 2016 Summer Olympics
World Athletics Championships athletes for Denmark
Athletes (track and field) at the 2020 Summer Olympics
Eastern Kentucky Colonels athletes
21st-century Danish people